Bright Vachirawit Chivaaree (born 27 December 1997), known professionally as Bright Vachirawit or Bright, is a Thai actor, singer, host, model, entertainer and entrepreneur. He is popular for his lead roles in F4 Thailand: Boys Over Flowers, 2gether: The Series and  Astrophile. He is a winner of the prestigious jury based "Nataraja Award" and "Mani Mekhala Award" for singing and acting respectively.

Early life and education 
Bright was born on 27 December 1997 in Nakhon Pathom, Thailand as Kunlatorn Chivaaree, he is of Thai-American-Chinese descent. His parents got divorced when he was a child. He grew up in Thailand along with his maternal relatives and his cousins. When he was a kid his mother named him "Bright", as the name has strong prominence. He could speak both Thai and English.

Bright grew up surrounded by musicians, as his uncle owned a music school. At the early age of 10, he started learning several musical instruments which included the guitar, bass, keyboard, piano and drums.
Bright completed his lower secondary education at Suankularb Wittayalai School and upper secondary education at Triam Udom Suksa School. He was brilliant in his studies, hence was assigned to special scholarship classes designed for such students. He worked as a part-timer for small roles in the entertainment industry and self sponsored his education.

He initially took up the Thammasat English Program of Engineering (TEPE) under the Faculty of Engineering of Thammasat University, however, he had to take an academic leave for a year to focus on his career. Later, he decided to pursue Bachelor's in Marketing (An International Program) at Bangkok University International College. In 2021, he completed his Bachelor of Business Administration (BBA) in Marketing and its graduation ceremony was held in December 2022.

Career and breakthrough

Television and film
In 2013, at the age of 15, Bright debuted as a variety show host in the 6th generation of Strawberry Krub Cake (SKC) on Channel 3 and made his acting debut in SKC's short drama titled The Beginning - Run Lovers Run produced by Duang Malee Maneejan and Nadao Bangkok. He featured in several small roles within the industry which includes TV dramas, music videos and a film. His notable performances are in Social Death Vote as "Day" and in I Sea U as "Peter".

In 2018, Bright auditioned for GMM25's New Face 2018 project and got signed as a GMMTV actor/artist. He received mostly supporting roles in few series. In 2019, he successfully auditioned for the role of "young Dr. Peng" in Nadao Bangkok's My Ambulance. In the same year, he become one of the hosts of GMM25's travel based show Toe Laew, joining the show in its first season from Episode 135. In 2020, he reprised his role as host in the show's second season.

In 2020, Bright earned his breakthrough when he played "Sarawat", his 1st lead role, in 2gether The Series. The series became Number 1 most viewed show on Line TV and gained domestic and international recognition. In 2020, he reprised his role as "Sarawat" in Still 2gether the sequel' and in the movie We are still 2gether in 2021, which premiered in Tokyo. In June 2021, Japanese director Shusuke Kaneko praised his intense acting on Twitter.

In 2021, Bright played the lead role of "Thyme" ("Domyoji Tsukasa") opposite Tu Tontawan, cast as "Gorya" ("Makino Tsukushi"), in F4 Thailand: Boys Over Flowers, a Thai adaptation of the Japanese manga Hana Yori Dango. He was selected for "Thyme" in 2019, but casting and shooting got delayed due to the COVID-19 pandemic. It finally aired on 18 December 2021 and was an international success which earned him a Mekhala Award. In April 2022,  Yoko Kamio, who wrote the original manga, tweeted about her delight in Bright's screen presence.

In 2022, he starred as "Kimhan", the main lead in the series Astrophile opposite actress Davika Hoorne. Acting coach Kru Rambutan Rossukon was impressed by his dedication. In November 2022, Bright's next movie project The Interest, a Thai adaptation of Man in Love, opposite actress Yaya was announced. His guest role in Midnight Museum as "Moth" received positive attention and was highlighted in Viu Singapore.

Singing journey
Bright in parallel to his acting, is focusing on his musical career. Initially, he appeared in various music videos for other singers. He did a live cover song at Miss Universe Thailand 2020. In July 2020, his first OPM song cover "With A Smile" was released as the official theme for Still 2gether Philippines version.

In 2021, he had fruitful collaboration with the rapper F.Hero for the song "Sad Movie". His first Thai single MV "Unmovable" is from the Boys Don't Cry project, a compilation album. In the same year, for his song "Kan Goo" he received the "Best Song Drama" in 12th Nataraja Awards which are considered an esteemed awarding organisation in Thailand.

In 2022, he launched the official music video for his first English single "Lost and Found". In addition, to reinforce his singing, he collaborated with singers like Bowkylion, Milli, Ink Waruntorn and Ally. He displayed his singing skills in the variety show The Wall Song. His song "Good Times" alongwith Thanaerng Kanyawee from Good Old Days OST is well received by general public. He had a successful stint in 2022 Octopopfest and Cat Expo Event in Thailand. He did musical concerts "Shooting Star", along with F4 Thailand cast, in South-East Asian countries.

In January 2023, he launched his single "My Ecstasy" Feat D. Gerrard under Riser Music, Thailand and his creative direction is admired. This song became most requested song on HITZ 955.

Brands
Bright is Brand Ambassador for various brands like Adidas, Samsung Galaxy A53 5G, Korean based Bonchon Chicken, Japanese based cat food Nekko, Kito slippers, Ichitan, Indonesian based skincare WhiteStory, along with endorsements like Lazada, Merci, Stardee, Cathydoll, Sparsha Spa Care, Scotch, Kiehl's and others. He is a coveted face in advertising with a high talent fee due to his public friendly image and reputation. On 10 July 2022, he as the brand ambassador for Adidas attended an event with Manchester United Players - Marcus Rashford, Bruno Fernandes and David de Gea.

His previous notable collaborations were with Gucci, Prada and Louis Vuitton. In February Winter Fall 2022, he was one among other Thai artists who generated most of Gucci's Earned Media Value (EMV). In Milan Fashion Week FW22 for Prada's he was named for having generated $934K in MIV. Launchmetrics' Chief Marketing Officer, Alison Bringé recognized Bright as one of the most prominent Asian celebrities creating buzz around fashion events.

Since 2020, Bright has been modeling for British luxury brand Burberry. He had special photography collaboration on "Lola Bags" and attended pop-up event at Tanjong Beach Club in Sentosa, Singapore. In August 2022, Burberry officially unveiled Bright as their first global Brand Ambassador from the South Asia-Pacific region. In London, he in his front-row debut at the British house's Spring Summer 2023 collection by Italian fashion designer Riccardo Tisci, garnered the brand $1.4M in EMV based on WWD report. He was present there alongside Simone Ashley, Kanye West, Milly Alcock and Gillian Anderson. On 20 February 2023, Bright attended Daniel Lee's debut Burberry AW23 collection, which led the brand top ranked and he was declared as major contributor with $1.9M in EMV.

In January 2023, Bright's featured as "First Solo Frontman" in Elle Men Magazine cover sponsored by Bvlgari. He is a regular invitee in Marvel Studio movie launch events, Thailand. Ministry of Tourism & Creative Economy of Indonesia appreciated his involvement in promoting Indonesian products and opening new connections between the countries, through Official Twitter account.

Personal image  

Bright launched his first merchandise under the brand name ASTRO Stuffs in late May 2020, and proceeds of the sale went to the Seub Nakhasathien Foundation to support conservation of wildlife and forest land in Thailand. In September 2021, he successfully reimaged the appearance, marketing and mission of the brand which would promote sustainable fashion, use of recycled plastic and philanthropy.

From November 2022 onwards, Bright's brand ASTRO stuffs came with "ONE Dream Team Goal" merchandise, where contributions, T-shirts & footballs goes to underprivileged kids with the motto "Right To Play - Protect. Educate. Empower".

By mid of March 2023, Bright had over 17.6M Instagram, 4.6M Twitter and 600K Spotify listeners. He is the most followed Thai Artist and 2nd Thai Celebrity across the globe. He created his YouTube channel to upload few cover songs and his personalised Facebook page which has over 970K followers. His lifestyle includes Muay Thai, Boxing and Football. He is a member of Monday Night Football Club. In addition, he enjoys photography which he sometimes shares via Isawitbefore, his exclusive photography account.

Bright constantly advocate on wildlife, forest conservation, animal shelter and charity. In fans organized charitable projects he has donated his photographic works for auction. His 2022 birthday project collected $75K through auction for charity. He has expressed his support for the LGBT community and for the legalization of same-sex marriage in Thailand.

Bright is ranked 7th in "Most Handsome and Beautiful in the World", 5th in "The Global Face & Style Icon" and top 3 in "Thailand's Most Popular Actor" He features frequently in "Top 20 King Choice Most Attractive Asian Celebs" and "Most Influential People in Fashion and Entertainment" alongside other eminent influencers, businessmen and executives from various fields. He featured on "Top 100 Most Searched Asian on Google Worldwide" in 2022. In January 2023, he was showcased on screens in Time Square, New York as "Top 20 Most Powerful and Influential Asian celebrities".

Filmography

Movies

Variety show

Television

Discography

Music video appearances

Singing journals

Awards and nominations 
*Few private voting based recognitions are not mentioned here.

References

External links 

 

1997 births
Living people
Vachirawit Chivaaree
Vachirawit Chivaaree
Vachirawit Chivaaree
Vachirawit Chivaaree
Vachirawit Chivaaree
Vachirawit Chivaaree
Vachirawit Chivaaree
Vachirawit Chivaaree